Stary Mutabash (İśke Mutabaş) is a rural locality (a selo) and the administrative center of Mutabashevsky Selsoviet, Askinsky District, Bashkortostan, Russia. The population was 218 as of 2010. There are 7 streets.

Geography 
Stary Mutabash is located 32 km northwest of Askino (the district's administrative centre) by road. Yanaul is the nearest rural locality.

References 

Rural localities in Askinsky District